George Couture (June 4, 1824 – November 4, 1887) was a Canadian merchant and politician.

Born in Saint-Joseph (now in Lauzon), Lower Canada, Couture was elected to the Lévis municipal council in 1865. He was mayor from 1870 to 1881. Couture was appointed to the Legislative Council of Quebec for Lauzon in 1881. A Conservative, he served until his death in 1887.

In 1884 he was made a Knight of the Order of the Holy Sepulchre.

References

1824 births
1887 deaths
Conservative Party of Quebec MLCs
People from Chaudière-Appalaches
Knights of the Holy Sepulchre